John Wengraf (23 April 1897 – 4 May 1974) was an Austrian actor.

Early years
Wengraf was born in Vienna, Austria-Hungary.

Career 
Wengraf became a matinee idol in the 1930s, and was director of the Vienna State Theatre. He emigrated to Britain in 1939 as the Nazis began their rise to power in Austria. While in London, he was involved with more than 100 plays as either director or actor.

Wengraf appeared unbilled in a couple of films, as well as in some of the first BBC live-television shows ever presented. In 1941 he appeared on Broadway with Helen Hayes in Candle in the Wind and decided to stay in the US. His other Broadway credits included The Traitor (1949) and The French Touch (1945). The following year he settled in the Los Angeles area.

He found himself invariably playing the very characters he detested. Some of his more nefarious nasties surfaced in such films as the Humphrey Bogart classic Sahara (1943), as well as The Boy from Stalingrad (1943), U-Boat Prisoner (1944) and Till We Meet Again (1944).

In post-war years, he portrayed ethnic professionals (scientists, doctors, professors, foreign royalty). His films included Tomorrow Is Forever (1946); he portrayed Count Von Papen in 5 Fingers (1952); and Ronchin in the Ethel Merman musical Call Me Madam (1953). In the 1950s and 1960s he transferred his talents to TV, appearing on a number of dramatic showcases and on such popular programs as The Untouchables (1959), Hawaiian Eye (1959), The Man from U.N.C.L.E. (1964) and The Time Tunnel (1966). His last few films included minor roles in the war-themed Judgment at Nuremberg (1961), Hitler (1962) and Ship of Fools (1965) as well as The Prize (1963).

Death 
Wengraf retired in 1966, and died in Santa Barbara, California, at the age of 77 on 4 May 1974.

Selected filmography

 Homo sum (1922)
 Frau Tod (1922)
 Die Menschen nennen es Liebe... (1922)
 Bretter, die die Welt bedeuten (1935) - Paul Rainer
 Convoy (1940) - Commander Deutschland
 Night Train to Munich (1940) - Concentration Camp Physician (uncredited)
 Sailors Three (1940) - German Captain
 Lucky Jordan (1942) - Herr Kesselman
 Mission to Moscow (1943) - Polish Ambassador Grzybowski (uncredited)
 The Boy from Stalingrad (1943) - German Major
 Sahara (1943) - Maj. Von Falken
 Paris After Dark (1943) - Dr. Mannheim (uncredited)
 Song of Russia (1944) - Red Army Commander
 The Seventh Cross (1944) - Overkamp
 U-Boat Prisoner (1944) - Gunther Rudehoff, Gestapo Agent
 Till We Meet Again (1944) - Gestapo Chief (uncredited)
 Strange Affair (1944) - Rudolph Kruger
 The Thin Man Goes Home (1944) - Big Man (uncredited)
 Hotel Berlin (1945) - Wolf von Buelow (uncredited)
 Week-End at the Waldorf (1945) - Alex
 Tomorrow Is Forever (1946) - Dr. Ludwig
 The Razor's Edge (1946) - Joseph - Butler
 T-Men (1947) - 'Shiv' Triano
 Sofia (1948) - Peter Goltzen
 Sealed Verdict (1948) - German doctor
 Wake of the Red Witch (1948) - Prosecuting Attorney (uncredited)
 The Lovable Cheat (1949) - Pierquin
 Belle Le Grand (1951) - Andrew Sinclair (uncredited)
 5 Fingers (1952) - Count Franz Von Papen
 Tropic Zone (1953) - Lukats
 Call Me Madam (1953) - Ronchin (uncredited)
 The Desert Rats (1953) - German Doctor (uncredited)
 Flight to Tangier (1953) - Kalferez
 The French Line (1953) - Commodore Renard
 Hell and High Water (1954) - Col. Schuman (uncredited)
 Paris Playboys (1954) - Vidal
 Gog (1954) - Dr. Zeitman
 The Gambler from Natchez (1954) - Nicholas Cadiz
 The Racers (1955) - Dr. Tabor
 Never Say Goodbye (1956) - Prof. Zimmelman
 Oh, Men! Oh, Women! (1957) - Dr. Krauss
 The Pride and the Passion (1957) - Sermaine
 Valerie (1957) - Mr. Horvat
 The Disembodied (1957) - Dr. Carl Metz
 The Walter Winchell File (1957, TV Series) - Leopold
 The Return of Dracula (1958) - John Meierman
 12 to the Moon (1960) - Dr. Erich Heinrich
 Portrait in Black (1960) - Dr. Kessler
 Judgment at Nuremberg (1961) - Dr. Karl Wieck
 Hitler (1962) - Dr. Morell
 The Prize (1963) - Hans Eckhart
 Ship of Fools (1965) - Graf

References

External links

 

Austrian male film actors
Austrian male stage actors
1897 births
1974 deaths
Emigrants from Austria after the Anschluss
Austrian male television actors
20th-century Austrian male actors
Male actors from Vienna
Austrian emigrants to the United Kingdom
British emigrants to the United States